Bodianus izuensis, the striped pigfish, is a species of wrasse. 
It is found in the Western Pacific Ocean.

Size

References

Fish of the Pacific Ocean
izuensis
Taxa named by Chūichi Araga
Taxa named by Tetsuo Yoshino
Fish described in 1975